The Smoky Hill Chalk Member of the Niobrara Chalk formation is a Cretaceous conservation Lagerstätte, or fossil rich geological formation, known primarily for its exceptionally well-preserved marine reptiles.  Named for the Smoky Hill River, the Smoky Hill Chalk Member is the uppermost of the two structural units of the Niobrara Chalk.  It is underlain by the Fort Hays Limestone Member; and the Pierre Shale overlies the Smoky Hill Chalk.  The Smoky Hill Chalk outcrops in parts of northwest Kansas, its most famous localities for fossils, and in southeastern Nebraska. Large well-known fossils excavated from the Smoky Hill Chalk include marine reptiles such as plesiosaurs, large  bony fish such as Xiphactinus, mosasaurs, flying reptiles or pterosaurs (namely Pteranodon), flightless marine birds such as Hesperornis,  and turtles.  Many of the most well-known specimens of the marine reptiles were collected by dinosaur hunter Charles H. Sternberg and his son George.  The son collected a unique fossil of the giant bony fish Xiphactinus audax with the skeleton of another bony fish, Gillicus arcuatus inside the larger one.  Another excellent skeleton of Xiphactinus audax was collected by Edward Drinker Cope during the late nineteenth century heyday of American paleontology and its Bone Wars.

Viewing and Access 
The general type area, the Smoky Hill River watershed in Logan and Gove Counties, has many badlands eroded into the Smoky Hill Chalk.

Some natural monuments of Smoky Hill Chalk in Kansas with public daylight access
 Castle Rock
 Little Jerusalem Badlands State Park
 Monument Rocks

References

External links
Everhart, M., nd, Oceans of Kansas Paleontology  web page
Everhart, M., nd, Remains of young mosasaurs from the Smoky Hill Chalk
Everhart, M., nd, Marine turtles from the Smoky Hill Chalk and Pierre Shale

Geologic formations of the United States
Cretaceous Kansas
Chalk
Lagerstätten